Samnorwood is a census-designated place (CDP) in Collingsworth County, Texas, United States. It was designated in or after 1980. The population was 51 at the 2010 census, up from 39 at the 2000 census. The hamlet of Samnorwood, for which the CDP was named, is located within the CDP.

Geography

Demographics
As of the census of 2000, there were 39 people, 16 households, and 12 families residing in the CDP. The population density was 24.0 people per square mile (9.2/km2). There were 20 housing units at an average density of 12.3/sq mi (4.7/km2). The racial makeup of the CDP was 87.18% White, 5.13% African American, 7.69% from other races. Hispanic or Latino of any race were 25.64% of the population.

There were 16 households, out of which 31.3% had children under the age of 18 living with them, 56.3% were married couples living together, 18.8% had a female householder with no husband present, and 25.0% were non-families. 25.0% of all households were made up of individuals, and 12.5% had someone living alone who was 65 years of age or older. The average household size was 2.44 and the average family size was 2.92.

In the CDP, the population was spread out, with 20.5% under the age of 18, 15.4% from 18 to 24, 15.4% from 25 to 44, 25.6% from 45 to 64, and 23.1% who were 65 years of age or older. The median age was 45 years. For every 100 females, there were 105.3 males. For every 100 females age 18 and over, there were 106.7 males.

The median income for a household in the CDP was $38,750, and the median income for a family was $38,750. Males had a median income of $58,125 versus $40,417 for females. The per capita income for the CDP was $30,690. There were no families and 2.4% of the population living below the poverty line, including no under eighteens and none of those over 64.

Education
Samnorwood is served by the Wellington Independent School District as of July 1, 2012. Prior to that date it was served by the Samnorwood Independent School District.

References

Census-designated places in Texas
Census-designated places in Collingsworth County, Texas